Robin Hardy may refer to:
Robin Hardy (American writer) (born 1955), American novelist
Robin Hardy (Canadian writer) (1952–1995), Canadian novelist and journalist
Robin Hardy (film director) (1929–2016), British film director